William James Ross (born June 6, 1941) is a former American football player who played with the Buffalo Bills. He played college football at the University of Nebraska.

References

1941 births
Living people
American football fullbacks
Nebraska Cornhuskers football players
Buffalo Bills players
Players of American football from Arkansas
People from Helena, Arkansas
American Football League players